David Mattingly may refer to:

 David B. Mattingly (born 1956), American illustrator
 David Mattingly (archaeologist) (born 1958), British historian and author

See also 

 David Mattingley (1922–2017), Australian pilot